Ice hockey is a sport that is slowly gaining popularity in India. Ice hockey is played mostly in places like Ladakh, Uttarakhand, West Bengal, Sikkim, Arunachal Pradesh, Himachal Pradesh and Jammu and Kashmir in the north of India, where cold weather occurs and the game can be played outdoors. Ice hockey enthusiasts from other places in the country, as well as expatriates from abroad, head to places like Ladakh for the experience of playing in some of the highest elevated rinks in the world. There are a few artificial indoor ice skating rinks in the rest of the country, such as the Doon Ice Rink in Dehradun, which can accommodate ice hockey with an international-sized rink.

Ice Hockey was part of the 2020 Khelo India Winter Games in Gulmarg.

Ladakh is host to the world's highest altitude women's ice hockey tournament.

About 
Ice Hockey in India is monitored by the Indian Ice Hockey Federation. The India national ice hockey team has been competing at the international level since 2009 with Head Coach Adam Sherlip behind the bench during the tournament in Abu Dhabi, UAE as well as the 2012 tournament hosted by India at the Doon Ice Rink.  Adam also coaches ice hockey in Ladakh through The Hockey Foundation. India won the 2nd position in IIHF men Challenge Cup of Asia Div 1 at Kuwait and Women's team secured the 3th position at Abu Dhabi.

Infrastructure 

 Gulmarg Ice Rink
 Leh Ice Rink
 Shimla Ice Rink
 Doon Ice Rink in Dehradun, hosted 2012 IIHF Challenge Cup of Asia

Ice Hockey clubs 
The country's two oldest ice hockey clubs are the Shimla Ice Skating Club, which has existed since 1920 but began playing ice hockey much later, and the Ladakh Winter Sports Club, which was established in 1995. The present clubs affiliated to the IHAI are:
 Ladakh Winter Sports Club
Indo-Tibetan Border Police
 Ladakh Scouts
 Chandigarh Winter Games Association
 Haryana Skiing and Ice Hockey Association
 Ice Hockey Association of Maharashtra, Mumbai 
 Ice Hockey Association of Jammu and Kashmir
 Shimla Ice Skating Club
 High Altitude Warfare School
 Ex-Servicemen League
 Kargil Ice and Snow Sports Club
 Ice Hockey Association of Uttarakhand
 Delhi Ice Hockey Association

In popular culture 
In 2011, an Indo-Canadian film, Speedy Singhs based on an Indian ice hockey team was produced by actor Akshay Kumar, who is a fan of the sport. He also made a contribution to the Ice Hockey Association of India to encourage greater participation and awareness in the sport.

See also
 Ice skating in India 
 Adam Sherlip
 Ladakh Woman Ice Hockey Foundation

References

External links
 Ice Hockey Association of India